Sir Henry Lello was an English diplomat, Warden of the Fleet Prison, and Keeper of the Palace of Westminster.

Lello went to Constantinople as an attache to the English Embassy to the Sublime Porte of the Ottoman Empire, but originally as secretary to Edward Barton.  In 1597 he took his place as ambassador.

As ambassador he was less popular in the court than his predecessors William Harborne and Sir Edward Barton and was less comfortable also, at one point stating that he was shocked by the extent of the violence and intrigue in the court of Mehmed III and his mother Safiye Sultan,  and in 1607 complaining that bribery was so widespread that the economy was now driven by the level of corruption and that neither religious or civil law had any place in it. He left Constantinople on 24 May 1607.

He began his term as ambassador by arranging the donation of an elaborate organ-clock commissioned by the queen Elizabeth I and built by organ-maker Thomas Dallam. The gift was intended to outshine overtures being made to the Sultan by Germany, France and other European nations in pursuit of trading rights in Ottoman territory.

References

See also
List of Ambassadors from the United Kingdom to the Ottoman Empire

16th-century births
17th-century deaths
Ambassadors of England to the Ottoman Empire
16th-century English diplomats
17th-century English diplomats